The Hythe Venetian Fete is a traditional "floating tableaux" (water carnival) that dates and derives back to the 1860s Hythe Cricket Week. It takes place on the third Wednesday in August, every two years, on the Royal Military Canal at Hythe in Kent, England.

The competitive fete is largely sponsored by local businesses and media (some of which have their own themed floats) and also features related entertainments, refreshments, band concerts, and fireworks throughout the evening illuminated variation.

2009's Venetian Fete took place on Wednesday 19 August 2009 with the Town Mayor and Chairman opening proceedings. Special guests in attendance include the local MP for Folkestone and Hythe and the Lord Warden of the Cinque Ports.

The 2020 event will not be held and is postponed until 2022.

External links
 Hythe Venetian Fete Society
City of Hythe festival page

Folkestone and Hythe District
Carnivals in the United Kingdom
Culture in Kent